KUYY is a radio station airing an adult top 40 format licensed to Emmetsburg, Iowa, broadcasting on 100.1 MHz FM.  The station brands as Y100.1, Today's Best Variety. The station serves the areas of Spencer, Iowa, Estherville, Iowa, and the Iowa Great Lakes and is owned by Community First Broadcasting, LLC. KUYY is sister stations with KUOO and KUQQ. The station studios are in Spencer.

References

External links
KUYY's official website

Adult top 40 radio stations in the United States
UYY